Bryant Turner Jr. (born November 25, 1987) is a former Canadian football defensive lineman. He made his professional debut with the Winnipeg Blue Bombers in 2011. He played college football at UAB.

Professional career

Winnipeg Blue Bombers
Bryant Turner signed with Winnipeg on May 9, 2011. On December 19, 2013, the Blue Bombers added two years to Turner's contract, extending his contract through the 2016 season. Following five seasons with the Bombers Turner was released by Winnipeg on March 22, 2016.

BC Lions 
On April 6, 2016, Bryant Turner signed a one-year contract with the BC Lions of the Canadian Football League.

Statistics

References

External links
 Canadian Football League profile
 
 
 UAB profile

1987 births
Living people
UAB Blazers football players
Winnipeg Blue Bombers players
Canadian football defensive linemen
Sportspeople from Mobile, Alabama
People from Daphne, Alabama
American players of Canadian football
American football defensive linemen
Players of American football from Alabama
BC Lions players
Calgary Stampeders players